FISEC (Foro Iberoamericano Sobre Estrategias de Comunicación) or "Ibero-American Forum on Communication Strategies" is a nonprofit association founded in 2003 by a group of academic and professional experts as a common meeting point in the field of communication and strategy. It includes more than 350 experts from 120 universities and 130 members of the mass media, institutions and firms from Latin American countries, the United States, Italy, France, Germany and Russia. Among the members are French epistemologist and essayist Edgar Morin,  Spanish psychologist José Luis Pinillos, Colombian philosopher Guillermo Hoyos, cultural anthropologist Constantin Von Barloewen (Harvard University Council, U.S.A.), and communicators and media analysts Jesús Martín Barbero (Pontificia Universidad Javierana, Bogotá), Rafael Alberto Pérez (Universidad Complutense de Madrid), Jesús Galindo Cáceres (Tecnológico de Monterrey, Mexico), José Carreño (Universidad Iberoamericana de México DF and ex spokesman for the Mexican Government) and Sandra Massoni (Universidad de Rosario, Argentina).

Through the debates carried out during FISEC's 7th International Conference and through a bibliography the organization is developing a “New Strategic Theory” which is explained in the book Hacia una teoría general de la estrategia (Ariel, 2009) written by two of its members with a prologue written by the Latin American Secretary General Enrique V. Iglesias.

Open access online is available for the conference papers, in the academic magazine FISEC-Estrategia, indexed on page 16.277 of the Latindex catalogue .

Objectives
FISEC's purpose is that its group should be open to those experts, academics and professionals who, from their different areas of discipline, have something to contribute regarding strategic communications and want to share it, in order to reach a new strategic theory as a result of exchanging their ideas.

Therefore, its objectives are:
  To become a place for dialogue so that experts, business people, leaders, researchers, docents and students can exchange ideas, projects, products, knowledge and experience of theoretical and practical strategy.
  To be an agent in the transformation of the strategy of the science of the conflict to the science of social articulation refounding the discipline from new perspectives.
  To contribute new models of strategic action.

Activities
  Leads the development of a New Strategic Theory, which is more focused on innovation than on confrontation.
  Generates debates concerning new currents of strategic thought in the areas of education, politics, socioeconomic development, health, security and defense, tourism, innovation, culture. To achieve this, annual international conferences are held.
  Investigates little discussed aspects of strategy, such as communications strategies used in the 2.0 web, strategic action models and the basic model of the strategy process.
  Promotes the exchange of ideas and knowledge through its web page, its academic magazine and its blog.

Geography
FISEC is present in 22 countries and has established national chapters in nine of them:
 Argentina
 Brazil
 Colombia
 Costa Rica
 Dominican Republic
 Mexico
 Peru
 Portugal
 Spain

Board of Directors
The current leadership team of FISEC was elected in October 2016 in Colombia:

 Rafael Alberto Perez (R.I.P) - Honor President.
 Raul Herrera - International President
 Manuel Quiterio Cedeño - Treasurer
 Haydée Guzmán - International Vice-president
 Dino Villegas - International Vice-president

References

 Hacia una teoría general de la estrategia (Rafael Alberto Pérez and Sandra Massoni, Ariel, 2009)
 Estrategias de Comunicación (Rafael Alberto Pérez, Ariel, 2001).

External links
Official site (Spanish)
Argentine official site (Spanish)
FISEC Blog (Spanish)
Strategic Communications Blog (Spanish)
Navigating a Fluid World Blog (Spanish)

Educational organizations based in South America
Organizations established in 2003
Organizations based in Latin America